The 14th Pan American Games were held in Santo Domingo, Dominican Republic from August 1 to August 17, 2003.

Medals

Silver

Men's Heavyweight (+ 100 kg): Joel Brutus

Bronze

Men's Lightweight (– 73 kg): Ernst Laraque

Men's + 80 kg: Sanon Tudor

Results by event

See also
Haiti at the 2004 Summer Olympics

References

Nations at the 2003 Pan American Games
Pan American Games
2003